Giorgio Malinverni is a Swiss law professor. On 27 June 2006, he was elected by the Parliamentary Assembly of the Council of Europe as the judge in respect of Switzerland on the European Court of Human Rights. He holds a PhD from the Graduate Institute of International Studies in Geneva.

References

External links
CV at the U.N.

1941 births
Living people
Graduate Institute of International and Development Studies alumni
Judges of the European Court of Human Rights
Academic staff of the University of Lausanne
Swiss judges of international courts and tribunals